Michel Droitecourt (born 30 October 1949) was a French rugby union player who was capped 17 times. He played for France.

Droitecourt played as Fullback for the AS Montferrandaise where he played 2 final of the French Championship. With France he played 3 five Nations Championship but didn't win any titles.

Honours 
 Selected to represent France, 1972–1977
 Challenge Yves du Manoir 1976
 French championship finalist 1970 and 1978

External links 
 ESPN profile

Living people
French rugby union players
France international rugby union players
1949 births
Rugby union fullbacks